An air sock is a textile or fabric duct used for draught-free air distribution and delivery of conditioned air as an alternative to traditional spiral or rectangular steel ducts with grilles and diffusers.  Fabric ducts are usually cheaper in material cost by no use of additional diffusers, and quicker to install than conventional metal systems.

Overview
The ducts can be suspended on any type of ceiling as the ducts only weigh approximately 1–5 kg depending on the duct size.
Air socks are mounted on extruded aluminium rails or cables, these are hung from the ceiling and continually support the ducts along their length.

The systems are very flexible and can be tailored to all possible dimensions, shapes and lengths for almost all types of rooms and applications.
Low velocity systems diffuse air through their surface or micro perforations, higher velocity, mixing systems use laser cut perforations or Textile Nozzles/Jets to throw the air.

The ducts come in a range of standard colors and also custom color, so they do not require protective painting.

Duct can also be made in half-round (d shape), quarter-round, circle section, oval and rectangle shapes.

Ducts also can be designed with internal or external suspension systems that will help maintain the shape of the duct without airflow.

Fabric ducting usually costs a lot less than traditional ducting systems as well as the installation time being significantly shorter. Cleaning air socks is far more efficient than with rigid ducting that often never gets cleans due to lack of accessibility; fabric ducting can be cleaned in a washing machine and easily be re-installed.

See also
 Windsock

References

  ACR News Masterclass October 2008
 ACR News Masterclass November 2008
 Ask The HvacMan

External links
 Curved air socks with nozzles
 Outlets on air socks
 Air sock smoke animation
 Low velocity ducting at London Zoo tropical Birdhouse
 evaporative cooling with air socks
 heating with a textile duct

Ventilation